Arthur Emanuel Nelson (May 10, 1892April 11, 1955) was an American lawyer and politician.

Biography
He graduated from Macalester College in 1912 and William Mitchell College of Law (then the St. Paul College of Law) in 1915. He also served briefly in the U.S. Army from August to November 1918.

Nelson was elected Mayor of Saint Paul, Minnesota, in 1922. He served two two-year terms.  Nelson unsuccessfully ran for the United States Senate as a Republican in 1928 against Henrik Shipstead (receiving 33.4% of the vote), but was elected fourteen years later, in November 1942 to finish out the term of deceased Senator Ernest Lundeen, which had temporarily been filled by appointee Joseph H. Ball (who won the November 1942 election for the full six-year term from 1943 to 1949). Nelson served less than two months, from November 18, 1942, to January 3, 1943. He never sought re-election.

Notes

1892 births
1955 deaths
Republican Party United States senators from Minnesota
Minnesota Republicans
Macalester College alumni
William Mitchell College of Law alumni
Minnesota lawyers
United States Army soldiers
United States Army personnel of World War I
20th-century American politicians
People from Browns Valley, Minnesota
20th-century American lawyers
20th-century American Episcopalians